HC Etro 92 Veliko Tarnovo was an ice hockey team in Veliko Tarnovo, Bulgaria. The club was founded in 1992. They played in the Bulgarian Hockey League in the 1998-99 and 2000-01 seasons. The club later returned to play in the Balkan League in the 2008-09 through 2010-11 seasons.

External links
Club profile on eurohockey.net

1992 establishments in Bulgaria
Bulgarian Hockey League teams
Ice hockey clubs established in 1992
Ice hockey teams in Bulgaria
Sport in Veliko Tarnovo